In geometry, the great icosihemidodecahedron (or great icosahemidodecahedron) is a nonconvex uniform polyhedron, indexed as U71. It has 26 faces (20 triangles and 6 decagrams), 60 edges, and 30 vertices.  Its vertex figure is a crossed quadrilateral.

It is a hemipolyhedron with 6 decagrammic faces passing through the model center.

Related polyhedra 

Its convex hull is the icosidodecahedron. It also shares its edge arrangement with the great icosidodecahedron (having the triangular faces in common), and with the great dodecahemidodecahedron (having the decagrammic faces in common).

Gallery

See also 
 List of uniform polyhedra

References

External links 
 
 Uniform polyhedra and duals

Uniform polyhedra